Stylosanthes hamata, the Caribbean stylo, is a species of flowering plant in the family Fabaceae. It is native to the islands of the Caribbean, and nearby areas on the mainland; Mexico, Guatemala, Costa Rica, Colombia, and Venezuela, and it has been introduced as a forage crop to Florida, Peru, Brazil, the Gambia, Burkina Faso, Benin, India, Thailand, Hainan, and northern Australia. There are diploid and tetraploid cultivars, with the tetraploids being more drought tolerant and more frequently sown for pasture.

References

hamata
Forages
Flora of the Caribbean
Flora of Northeastern Mexico
Flora of Northwestern Mexico
Flora of Guatemala
Flora of Costa Rica
Flora of Colombia
Flora of Venezuela
Plants described in 1890
Flora without expected TNC conservation status